The Daily Advertiser  may refer to the following newspapers:

 The Daily Advertiser (Wagga Wagga), Australia
 The Daily Advertiser (Lafayette, Louisiana), United States
 Boston Daily Advertiser, United States
 Daily Gazetteer, London, 1735–1797; also issued under other, related, names

See also
 Advertiser (disambiguation)